San Basilio de Palenque or Palenque de San Basilio, often referred to by the locals simply as Palenke, is a Palenque village and corregimiento in the Municipality of Mahates, Bolivar in northern Colombia. Palenque was the first free African town in the Americas, and in 2005 was declared a Masterpiece of the Oral and Intangible Heritage of Humanity by UNESCO.

History

Spaniards introduced enslaved Africans in South America through the Magdalena River Valley. Its mouth is close to the important port of Cartagena de Indias where ships full of Africans arrived. Some Africans escaped and set up Palenque de San Basilio, a town close to Cartagena. This community began in 1619, when Domingo Biohó led a group of about 30 runaways into the forests, and defeated attempts to subdue them. Biohó declared himself King Benkos, and his palenque of San Basilio attracted large numbers of runaways to join his community. His Maroons defeated the first expedition sent against them, killing their leader Juan Gómez. The Spanish arrived at terms with Biohó, but later they captured him, accused him of plotting against the Spanish, and had him hanged.

They tried to free all enslaved Africans arriving at Cartagena and were quite successful. Therefore, the Spanish Crown issued a Royal Decree (1691), guaranteeing freedom to the Palenque de San Basilio Africans if they stopped welcoming new escapees. But runaways continued to escape to freedom in San Basilio. In 1696, the colonial authorities subdued another rebellion there, and between 1713-7. Eventually, the Spanish agreed to peace terms with the palenque of San Basilio, and in 1772, this community of maroons was included within the Mahates district, as long they no longer accepted any further runaways.

The Village
The village of Palenque de San Basilio has a population of about 3,500 inhabitants and is located in the foothills of the Montes de María, southeast of the regional capital, Cartagena. The word "palenque" means "walled city" and the Palenque de San Basilio is only one of many walled communities that were founded by escaped slaves as a refuge in the seventeenth century. Of the many palenques of escaped enslaved Africans that existed previously San Basilio is the only one that survives. Many of the oral and musical traditions have roots in Palenque's African past. Africans were dispatched to Spanish America under the asiento system.

The village of San Basilio is inhabited mainly by Afro-Colombians which are direct descendants of enslaved Africans brought by the Europeans during the Colonization of the Americas and have preserved their ancestral traditions and have developed also their own language; Palenquero. In 2005 the Palenque de San Basilio village was proclaimed Masterpiece of the Oral and Intangible Heritage of Humanity by UNESCO.

In the village of Palenque de San Basilio most of its inhabitants are black and still preserve customs and language from their African ancestors. In recent years people of indigenous ancestry have settled at the borders of Palenque, being displaced earlier by the Colombian civil war. The village was established by Benkos Bioho sometime in the 16th century.

One of the first anthropological studies of the inhabitants of Palenque de San Basilio was published by anthropologist Nina de Friedemann and photographer Richard Cross in 1979 entitled Ma Ngombe: guerreros y ganaderos en Palenque.

Palenquero language 

A Spanish-based creole language known as Palenquero originates in this community. The New York Times reported on October 18, 2007 that the language spoken in Palenque is thought to be the only Spanish-based creole language spoken in Latin America. Being a creole language, its grammar differs substantially from Spanish making the language unintelligible to Spanish speakers. Palenquero was influenced by the Kikongo language of Congo and Angola, and also by Portuguese, the language of the slave traders who brought enslaved Africans to South America in the 17th century. Exact information on the different roots of Palenquero is still lacking, and there are different theories of its origin. Today fewer than half of the community's 3,000 residents still speak Palenquero.

A linguist born in Palenquero is compiling a lexicon for the language and others are assembling a dictionary of Palenquero. The defenders of Palenquero continue working to keep the language alive.

Notable residents
Benkos Biohó
Antonio Cervantes
Evaristo Márquez
Ricardo Cardona
Prudencio Cardona

See also
 Masterpieces of the Oral and Intangible Heritage of Humanity
 UNESCO Intangible Cultural Heritage Lists
 Quilombo
 Maroons

References

External links
 UNESCO: The Cultural Space of Palenque de San Basilio
  Colombian Ministry of Culture: San Basilio de Palenque, immaterial patrimony of Colombia
 CNN video
NYTIMES:A Language, Not Quite Spanish, With African Echoes

Further reading
Palenque Through the Eyes of My Heart: My First Trip by Vivian Liberman

Corregimientos of Mahates
Masterpieces of the Oral and Intangible Heritage of Humanity
Afro-Colombian
Corregimientos of Colombia